Kåre Fasting (1907–1983) was a Norwegian journalist, newspaper editor, novelist, biographer and non-fiction writer. He was a journalist for the newspaper Bergens Tidende from 1935, and edited Nidaros from 1945 to 1950. His literary début was the novel Havet gav from 1935.

References

1907 births
1983 deaths
Writers from Oslo
Norwegian newspaper editors
Norwegian biographers
Male biographers
Norwegian non-fiction writers
20th-century Norwegian novelists
20th-century biographers
Norwegian male novelists
20th-century Norwegian male writers
Male non-fiction writers